Princess Tyra is a 2007 Ghanaian Nigerian drama film directed by Frank Rajah Arase, and starring Jackie Aygemang, Van Vicker & Yvonne Nelson. 
The film received 12 nominations and won 2 awards at the 2008 Africa Movie Academy Awards, including the awards for Best Costume & Best Makeup.

Cast
Yvonne Nelson - Princess Tyra
Jackie Appiah - Maafia
Van Vicker - Prince Kay
Oge Okoye - Princess Elizabeth
Kalsoume Sinare - theo Agnes

Reception 
Nollywood Reinvented gave it a 4 out of 5 rating concluding that "Say what you may against the movie, you can not deny, however, that it was an interesting story".

References

External links
 

2007 films
2007 drama films
Ghanaian drama films
Nigerian drama films
English-language Ghanaian films
English-language Nigerian films
Best Makeup Africa Movie Academy Award winners
Best Costume Design Africa Movie Academy Award winners
2000s English-language films